The Growler Valley is a valley of south-central Arizona west of Ajo, Arizona.

Most of Growler Valley is located in the Cabeza Prieta National Wildlife Refuge, with part located in the Barry M. Goldwater Air Force Range.

The Growler Wash transits the valley northwesterly, and turns west to meet the San Cristobal Wash at the north end of the Granite Mountains. The Growler Valley is the southeast portion of the San Cristobal Wash Watershed and drains from the north perimeter of the Organ Pipe Cactus National Monument. Drainages south flow into northern Sonora, Mexico. The northwesterly-flowing San Cristobal drainage disappears into the ground before reaching the Gila River Valley.

The Growler Valley & Growler Mountains are located at 32.2428-N, 113.0279-W.

Access to Growler Valley
The closest access points to the Growler are by dirt road from Ajo, Arizona on State Route 85.

References

External links
 San Cristobal Wash Watershed Map - Growler valley is in the southeast, 1/3 of the watershed.
 Trails near Growler Mountains, east Growler Valley, trails.com (coordinates)

Valleys of Arizona
Landforms of Pima County, Arizona
Landforms of Maricopa County, Arizona